İskele Sub-district is a sub-district of İskele District, Northern Cyprus.

References 

İskele District